Daniel Clausner (born 1 April 1985) is a retired German Paralympic swimmer who competed in international elite events. He is a double Paralympic champion and a seven-time World medalist.

References

1985 births
Living people
Swimmers from Leipzig
Paralympic swimmers of Germany
Swimmers at the 2000 Summer Paralympics
Swimmers at the 2004 Summer Paralympics
Swimmers at the 2008 Summer Paralympics
Medalists at the 2004 Summer Paralympics
Medalists at the World Para Swimming Championships
German male freestyle swimmers
German male breaststroke swimmers
German male medley swimmers
S13-classified Paralympic swimmers
21st-century German people